Quincy Town Center is a highly visible mixed-use development in Quincy, Illinois. It was formerly known as Quincy Mall from 1978 to 2021  and was originally an outdoor complex called the American Legion Miracle Mile Town and Country Shopping Center. The outdoor shopping center opened in 1958. The indoor complex opened November 14, 1978 and the mall's anchor tenants are Slumberland Furniture, Quincy Medical Group, and VIP Cinemas. Both shopping centers were created by Don M. Casto Organization of Columbus, Ohio. In 2006, the mall was purchased by Cullinan Properties.

History
The mall was originally an outdoor shopping center called American Legion Miracle Mile Town and Country Shopping Center, built in the late 1950s and opening in 1958. The land had been purchased from the local American Legion and launched with Kresge’s, W.T. Grant, National Supermarkets, Kroger food stores and Shoppers Fair anchoring the mile-long strip mall. In 1968, the shopping center went by the shorter Town & Country Shopping Center moniker adding the Town & Country Cinema. With its 20th anniversary approaching and many leases set to lapse, Casto had planned to build an entirely new shopping mall 1.5 miles to the west on Broadway and 48th Street. But a revised plan enclosed the mall which launched as the rebranded Quincy Mall on November 14, 1978. The mall was originally anchored by Bergner's and Sears, with J. C. Penney added on in 1982. In 2006, Cullinan Properties bought the mall from Casto. Six years later, Cullinan asked for the city of Quincy to expand a redevelopment agreement made in 2006.

In a three-year period, the Quincy Mall lost its original three anchors. J. C. Penney announced that it would close the Quincy Mall store in April 2015. After its closure, its space was occupied by Slumberland Furniture two years later. In August 2018, both remaining, original anchors also closed at the Quincy Mall. The Bergner's store was closed and liquidated on August 28, 2018, following the cessation of Bergner's parent company Bon-Ton. Sears Holdings also announced the closure of its Sears store and automotive center on May 17, 2018, which closed on August 11. The Sears and Bergner's closures in 2018 left Slumberland Furniture as the only anchor remaining. In 2019, VIP Cinemas joined the mall as an anchor tenant. Quincy Medical Group converted the former Bergner's space into a cancer institute and surgery center and joined Quincy Mall an anchor in 2020.

In March 2021, Cullinan Properties officially rebranded the property to Quincy Town Center. The new identity reflected a fresh image and direction for the next chapter of the mixed-use property, one that embraces Quincy Medical Group, Slumberland and VIP Cinemas as anchors of the center and allows for growth of a broad mix of quality local and national tenants and user types, in addition to quality choices for shopping and dining.

References

External links
Official website

1978 establishments in Illinois
Shopping malls established in 1978
Shopping malls in Illinois
Tourist attractions in Quincy, Illinois
Buildings and structures in Quincy, Illinois